Konimba Sidibe (born 18 October 1956) is a Malian politician. He serves as the Malian Minister Investment Promotion & the Private Sector.

Early life
Konimba Sidibe was born on 18 October 1956 in N’Djiballa, Dioïla Cercle, Mali. He earned a doctorate in economics from a French university. While he was a student, he joined the Black African Students Federation in France.

Career
Sidibe returned to Mali in 1985; by 1991, he was in charge of the ministry of public finance. He joined the National Congress for Democratic Initiative. He later co-founded the Party for National Rebirth. In April 2013, he founded a new political party known as the Mouvement pour un destin commun (Modec), and he ran in the 2013 Malian presidential election.

As of 2016, Sidibe serves as the Malian Minister Investment Promotion & the Private Sector.

References

Living people
1956 births
People from Koulikoro Region
Malian economists
Government ministers of Mali
21st-century Malian people